Owen Moran (4 October 1884 – 17 March 1949) was an English boxer. Known as "The Fearless", Moran is recognized by some historians as a former world bantamweight champion.  During his career, Moran knocked out former lightweight king Battling Nelson and also fought boxing greats Jim Driscoll, Packey McFarland, Abe Attell, Ad Wolgast, Frankie Neil and George Dixon. Moran retired in 1916 with over 100 fights. He was inducted into the International Boxing Hall of Fame in 2002.

Professional boxing record
All information in this section is derived from BoxRec, unless otherwise stated.

Official record

All newspaper decisions are officially regarded as “no decision” bouts and are not counted in the win/loss/draw column.

Unofficial record

Record with the inclusion of newspaper decisions in the win/loss/draw column.

References

External links
 
IBHOF Biography – Owen Moran

1884 births
1949 deaths
International Boxing Hall of Fame inductees
English male boxers
Boxers from Birmingham, West Midlands
Featherweight boxers